Mohammad Nadir Shah (Persian and  – born Mohammad Nadir Khan; 9 April 1883 – 8 November 1933) was King of Afghanistan from 15 October 1929 until his assassination in November 1933. Previously, he served as Minister of War, Afghan Ambassador to France, and as a general in the Royal Afghan Army. He and his son Mohammad Zahir Shah, who succeeded him, are part of the Musahiban.

Background

Nadir Khan was born on 9 April 1883 in Dehradun, British India, in the Musahiban branch of the Royal dynasty of Afghanistan (of the Mohammadzai section of Barakzai Pashtuns). His father was Mohammad Yusuf Khan and his mother was Sharaf Sultana Hukumat Begum. His paternal grandfather was Yahya Khan and his great grandfather was Sultan Mohammad Khan Telayee, the brother of Dost Mohammad Khan. Nadir's ancestors were exiled to British India by Emir Abdur Rahman Khan after the Emir realized their aspiration for power. Abdur Rahman advised his incumbent Crown Prince Habibullah not to allow "Al-Yahya" family to enter the country under any terms or conditions. In 1901 Abdul Rahman died and Habibullah was crowned emir. In 1912, Nadir assisted in helping the Afghan government defeat the Khost rebellion. Unlike his father, Amir Habibullah had many weaknesses, including philandery. During an official visit to the British India, Amir Habibullah married one of Nader's sisters; this was the time that the Nader family moved to Afghanistan. Nader became the minister of war during Amanullah while concealing his ambitions to become the King. Nader and his brothers played an important role in destabilizing Amani government and they started to support Habibullāh Kalakāni.

Rise to power

After growing up in India, Nadir Khan first went to Afghanistan when his grandfather Mohammad Yahya was authorized to return from exile by the British and Abdur Rahman Khan. He later became a general under King Amanullah Khan and led the Royal Afghan Army in the Third Anglo-Afghan War. After the war, Nadir Khan was made Minister of War and from early 1924 to 1926 he was Afghan Ambassador to France.

Shortly after a rebellion by some Pashtun tribesmen and Tajik forces of Habibullāh Kalakāni against the monarchy, Nadir Khan was exiled due to disagreements with King Amanullah. After the overthrow of Amanullah Khan's monarchy by Habibullah Kalakani, he returned to Afghanistan with his army of Mangal, Mahsud and Wazir tribesmen and took most of Afghanistan. By 13 October 1929, Forces loyal to Nadir captured Kabul and subsequently sacked the city, and he arrived in the city on the 15th. He captured Kalakani and executed him by firing squad on the west wall of the Arg on 1 November 1929, along with Kalakani's brother, and 9 other members of Kalakani's inner circle.

King of Afghanistan

As Shah of Afghanistan Nadir Khan quickly abolished most of Amanullah Khan's reforms, but despite his efforts to rebuild an army that had just been engaged in suppressing a rebellion, the forces remained weak while the religious and tribal leaders grew strong. Nadir faced many insurrections, including the Koh Daman revolt (29 November – 30 June), the Shinwari rebellion (February 1930), operations against Ibrahim Beg (November 1930 – April 1931), the Ghilzai threat (1931), the Darre Khel revolt (November 1932), and disturbances in Khost. The same year, a Soviet force crossed the border in pursuit of an Uzbek leader whose forces had been harassing the Soviets from his sanctuary in Afghanistan. He was driven back to the Soviet side by the Afghan army in April 1930, and by the end of 1931 most uprisings had been subdued.

Nadir Khan named a ten-member cabinet, consisting mostly of members of his family, and in September 1930 he called into session a loya jirga of 286 which confirmed his accession to the throne. In 1931, the King promulgated a new constitution. Despite its appearance as a constitutional monarchy, the document effectively instituted a Royal oligarchy, and popular participation was merely an illusion.

Although Nadir Khan placated religious factions with a constitutional emphasis on orthodox denominational principles, he also took steps to modernize Afghanistan in material ways, although far less obtrusively than Amanullah. He improved road construction, especially the Great North Road through the Hindu Kush, methods of communication, and helped establish Afghanistan's first university in 1931; however, this university (Kabul University) did not admit any students until 1932. He forged commercial links with the same foreign powers that Amanullah had established diplomatic relations with in the 1920s, and, under the leadership of several prominent entrepreneurs, he initiated a banking system and long-range economic planning. Although his efforts to improve the army did not bear fruit immediately, by the time of his death in 1933 Nadir Shah had created a 40,000-strong military force.

Assassination
On 8 November 1933, Nadir Khan was visiting a high school and was shot dead by Abdul Khaliq during a graduation ceremony. An ethnic Hazara, Abdul Khaliq was immediately apprehended, tortured and then executed by quartering along with most of his relatives including his father and uncle. According to Hafizullah Emadi, "The government arrested Abdul Khaliq, his family, and friends, and used this opportunity to arrest other potential rivals and execute them on charges of plotting the assassination of King Nadir." His remains were buried in Kabul on Nader Khan Hill (Maranjan Hill).

Ancestry

Titles and styles

During his reign, His Majesty Mohammed Nadir Shah, King of Afghanistan.

References and footnotes

External links

Afghanistan Online: Biography – Mohammad Nadir Shah
Bārakzay dynasty – Encyclopædia Britannica
 

1883 births
1933 deaths
20th-century Afghan monarchs
20th-century Afghan politicians
20th-century murdered monarchs
Kings of Afghanistan
Barakzai dynasty
Ambassadors of Afghanistan to France
Assassinated royalty
Pashtun people
Grand Croix of the Légion d'honneur
1929 in Afghanistan
1930s in Afghanistan
Afghan Civil War (1928–1929)
People from Dehradun